Gonic is a neighborhood in the city of Rochester in Strafford County, New Hampshire, United States. The community is separated from the downtown area of Rochester by New Hampshire Route 16, the Spaulding Turnpike. New Hampshire Route 125 passes to the west of the community, leading south towards East Barrington and the Lee traffic circle.

Gonic has a separate ZIP code (03839) from other parts of Rochester.

In popular culture
 Rod Picott sings of selling scrap metal in Gonic in his song "All the Broken Parts" from the album Hang Your Hopes on a Crooked Nail.

References

Unincorporated communities in Strafford County, New Hampshire
Unincorporated communities in New Hampshire